The London Bridge is a bridge over the River Dodder in Dublin, Ireland. The current bridge was opened in 1857 with an unknown engineer designing the structure. A previous bridge was built at some point between 1798 and 1837 based on historical maps of Dublin.

The bridge connects Bath Avenue to Londonbridge Road on the R111 road. Traffic across the bridge is limited to one lane by traffic lights at each end.

References

External links
map of Dublin, 1798

Bridges in Dublin (city)